Calochilus herbaceus, commonly known as the copper beard orchid or pale beard orchid, is a species of orchid native to south-eastern Australia and northern New Zealand. It has a single very short, rigid, fleshy leaf and up to eight pale green to brownish flowers with reddish stripes and a purple "beard".

Description
The base of the labellum has between two and six smooth, metallic blue plates and the middle part has a few bristly purple hairs. The column has two sham "eyes" joined by a faint ridge. Flowering occurs from October to January but each flower only lasts for one or two days.

Taxonomy and naming
Calochilus herbaceus was first formally described in 1840 by John Lindley from a specimen collected near Rocky Cape, Tasmania, Australia. The description was published in his book The Genera and Species of Orchidaceous Plants. The genus name Calochilus is from the Greek "kalos" (beautiful) and "cheilos" (lip), referring to the flower's labellum, while the specific epithet (herbaceus) is Latin for "of plants".

New Zealand populations and some plants in Australia seem to differ from other C. herbaceus and may represent a separate species.

Distribution and habitat
In Australia this orchid grows in wet coastal scrub, sedges and heath in southern Victoria and Tasmania (including Flinders Island and King Island). In New Zealand it is found in ephemeral wetlands and peat bogs in Northland, in a few scattered populations from Te Paki south to Albany, Auckland.

Conservation status 
In New Zealand, C. herbaceus is listed as Threatened, Nationally Critical, with the qualifiers EF (extreme fluctuations), SO (secure overseas), and Sp (sparse) in the most recent assessment (2017-2018) of the New Zealand Threatened Classification for plants. It is estimated there are less than 250 total individuals of this species in New Zealand.

References

External links 

 Calochilus herbaceus discussed in RNZ Critter of the Week, 23 December 2023
 Calochilus herbaceus occurrence data from Australasian Virtual Herbarium

herbaceus
Endemic orchids of Australia
Orchids of Victoria (Australia)
Orchids of New Zealand
Orchids of Tasmania
Plants described in 1840